Bergstresser is a surname. Notable people with the surname include:

Charles Bergstresser (1858–1923), American journalist and businessman
Ethel Bergstresser McCoy (1893–1980), American philatelist